KBYA (89.9 FM) is an American non-commercial radio station, licensed to serve the community of Afton, Wyoming. The station, which received its broadcast license in 2011, is operated by the Brigham Young University–Idaho.

The station currently rebroadcasts KBYI.

External links
 

BYA
Radio stations established in 2011